Patrick Francis Griffin (16 June 1886 – 24 February 1965) was an Australian rules footballer who played with St Kilda in the Victorian Football League (VFL).

Notes

External links 

1886 births
1965 deaths
Australian rules footballers from Victoria (Australia)
St Kilda Football Club players
Caulfield Football Club players